The Montgomery Delegation refers to the delegates who are elected from legislative districts in Montgomery County, Maryland to serve in the Maryland House of Delegates.

Authority and responsibilities
The Delegation is responsible for representing the interests, needs and concerns of the citizens of Montgomery County in the Maryland General Assembly. Subcommittees of the Montgomery County Delegation are: the WSSC Matters Committee,  the County Affairs Committee and the Land Use and Transportation Committee.

Current members

See also
 Current members of the Maryland State Senate

References

External links
 Maryland General Assembly
 Delegation Website

Delegations in the Maryland General Assembly
Montgomery County, Maryland